Anton Shunto (born 31 May 1988) is a Belarusian professional footballer who plays for Zhodino-Yuzhnoye.

He is a younger brother of Denis Shunto, who is a founder and former president of Krumkachy Minsk.

Career

Shunto started his career with FC Krumkachy Minsk.

References

External links 
 
 

1988 births
Living people
Belarusian footballers
Association football goalkeepers
FC Krumkachy Minsk players
FC Molodechno players
FC Baranovichi players